Federico Nicolás Varela Escudero (born 7 May 1996) is an Argentine professional footballer who plays as an attacking midfielder for Phoenix Rising FC in the USL Championship.

Club career 
Varela was born in Buenos Aires, but moved to Viveiro, Galicia at early age and started his career at Viveiro CF's youth setup. He subsequently finished his formation with Celta de Vigo, but moved to Stade Nyonnais in August 2014.

Varela made his senior debut on 24 September 2014, starting in a 3–1 home loss against FC Köniz. He scored his first goal for the club on 8 November, but in a 2–1 home defeat to SC Brühl. He left the club after three goals in 21 appearances in all competitions.

On 29 January 2015, Varela joined FC Porto and was immediately assigned to the reserves. He made his debut on 15 August, coming on as a second-half substitute for João Graça in a 2–1 away win against CD Santa Clara.

On 21 January 2018, Varela was loaned to Primeira Liga side Portimonense S.C. until the end of the season. He made his debut in the category eight days later, playing the last ten minutes in a 4–1 home routing of Rio Ave FC.

On 30 July 2018, Varela returned to Spain after agreeing to a one-year loan deal with Segunda División side CF Rayo Majadahonda. The following 4 July, he signed a permanent three-year deal with La Liga side CD Leganés. On 30 December 2019, he joined UD Las Palmas on loan until June.

On 15 September 2020, Varela terminated his contract with Lega. He signed with Phoenix Rising FC on December 21, 2022.

Career statistics

Honours
CSKA Sofia
 Bulgarian Cup: 2020–21

References

External links

1996 births
Living people
Footballers from Buenos Aires
Argentine footballers
Spanish footballers
Association football midfielders
Primeira Liga players
Liga Portugal 2 players
FC Porto B players
USL Championship players
Segunda División players
CF Rayo Majadahonda players
CD Leganés players
UD Las Palmas players
Denizlispor footballers
PFC CSKA Sofia players
Phoenix Rising FC players
Argentine expatriate footballers
Argentine expatriate sportspeople in Portugal
Expatriate footballers in Portugal
Argentine expatriate sportspeople in Spain
Expatriate footballers in Spain
Argentine expatriate sportspeople in Turkey
Expatriate footballers in Turkey
Argentine expatriate sportspeople in Switzerland
Expatriate footballers in Switzerland
Argentine expatriate sportspeople in Bulgaria
Expatriate footballers in Bulgaria
Argentine expatriate sportspeople in the United States
Expatriate soccer players in the United States